Bahbari Gaon is a census town in Tinsukia district  in the state of Assam, India.

Demographics
 India census, Bahbari Gaon had a population of 6159. Males constitute 54% of the population and females 46%. Bahbari Gaon has an average literacy rate of 79%, higher than the national average of 59.5%; with 56% of the males and 44% of females literate. 9% of the population is under 6 years of age.

References

Cities and towns in Tinsukia district
Tinsukia